Eduardo Héctor Peralta Castillo (born 18 April 1947) is a Chilean former footballer who played as a defensive midfielder for clubs in Chile and Mexico.

Club career
A product of Universidad de Chile youth system, he made his debut in 1966 making two appearances, and stayed with the club until 1972. Peralta scored a remembered goal against the Uruguayan club Nacional in the second phase of the 1970 Copa Libertadores, where the team reached the semi-finals.

Next he spent five seasons in Mexico with San Luis Potosí (1972–75) and Atlético Potosino (1976), coinciding in the Mexican football with his former fellow Roberto Hodge and also his compatriot Osvaldo Castro. He returned to Universidad de Chile in 1977.

After leaving Universidad de Chile, he played for Aviación, Deportes Antofagasta, Regional Atacama and Unión San Felipe.

International career
Peralta made twelve appearances for the Chile national team from 1971 to 1972 and scored two goals against Bolivia on 15 August 1971.

Honours
Universidad de Chile
 Chilean Primera División (1): 1969
  (1): 1969
  (2): 1968, 1969

Chile
  (1): 
  (1):

References

External links
 
 
 Eduardo Peralta at SoloFutbol.cl 

1947 births
Living people
People from Antofagasta
Chilean footballers
Chilean expatriate footballers
Chile international footballers
Universidad de Chile footballers
C.D. Antofagasta footballers
San Luis F.C. players
Atlético Potosino footballers
C.D. Aviación footballers
Regional Atacama footballers
Unión San Felipe footballers
Chilean Primera División players
Primera B de Chile players
Liga MX players
Chilean expatriate sportspeople in Mexico
Expatriate footballers in Mexico
Association football midfielders